Katrin Adlkofer or Kathrin Adlkofer (born 5 September 1966 in Munich) is a German sailor.

Together with Susanne Bauckholt she won the world championship in the 470 in 1987 and 1989. They also and competed at 1988 and 1996 Olympics, finishing fifth each time.

References

External links
  
 
 

1966 births
Living people
Sportspeople from Munich
German female sailors (sport)
Sailors at the 1988 Summer Olympics – 470
Sailors at the 1996 Summer Olympics – 470
Olympic sailors of Germany
470 class world champions
World champions in sailing for Germany